Readymades is the tenth studio album by Chumbawamba. It also features vocal samples from contemporary and traditional folk artists, some of whom Chumbawamba would go on to work with in the future. The album's title refers to the use of everyday objects as art by Marcel Duchamp.

The album's artwork pays a homage to the I Have Nothing to Say And I'm Saying It poster designed by Alan Fletcher, which was in turn a self-portrait of German Dadaist John Heartfield (born Helmut Herzfelde).

Critical reception
The album was met with mixed reviews from critics. Writing for AllMusic, critic Michael Gallucci awarded the album three stars out of five; Gallucci praised the album's consistency and noted that it "basically follows the pattern laid out on their previous two albums," adding that "the pop is a little more forward, as is the political theorizing." Music critic Robert Christgau dismissed the album as containing "faux-slick truths about real world horror", singling out "All in Vain" and "Don't Pass Go" as highlights. The album holds a rating of one and a half stars in the Rolling Stone Album Guide, which called the album "skippable" and commented that it was "a vacant, hookless dud: folk song samples and bland singing pasted onto prefab dance grooves."

Release
The album was released on 18 June 2002. A special version of the album, Readymades And Then Some was released in 2003. It came with bonus track–peace anthem "Jacob's Ladder (Not in My Name)" and a bonus DVD.

Track listing
All tracks written, arranged and produced by Chumbawamba, except where noted.

Album detail
In a statement on their website, Chumbawamba stated that "When we decided to mimic Moby's sampling of traditional black American blues singers on his album Play, we turned to British folk music and its great voices. Kate Rusby, Dick Gaughan, Coope, Boyes & Simpson, Harry Cox. Our album Readymades was put together in a skewed homage to some of those voices. We half expected criticism from the folk world for messing around with the music, but found that the folk audience is assuredly open to change and diversity. Since then – even in the last four or five years – the modern folk voices and players have multiplied and expanded, folkies are looking younger and cooler and there are loads of new folk albums out every month. Good or bad, the music's often inspiring and exciting. That there's still a radical voice in folk music (and especially in its audience) makes it easy for us to write and play the way we're doing right now. Trying to be part of a radical tradition that, for us, encompasses our own histories (mostly northern working towns, The Beatles and punk rock!) and the history of rebel songs in the places we've lived."

Personnel

 Jude Abbott – Trumpet, vocals
 Dunstan Bruce – Vocals, bruitist sound collages
 Lou Watts – Vocals, keyboards
 Boff Whalley – Guitar, merz
 Neil Ferguson – Bass, mouse
 Alice Nutter – Vocals, propaganda
 Harry Hamer – Drums, programming
 Danbert Nobacon – Vocals, ukulele

with
 Simon Pugsley – Trombone
 Toby Greenwood – Saxophone
 Rrose Selavy – Acoustic guitar
 James Reiss – Scratching
 Richard Mutt – Tea-chest bass
 Michelle Plum (credited as Michelle Plumb), Abi Riozzi, Sally Riozzi & Janet Russell – vocals

References

Chumbawamba albums
2002 albums